Élie Dufraisse (23 November 1880 – 26 April 1915) was a French fencer. He competed in the men's masters épée event at the 1900 Summer Olympics.

References

External links
 

1880 births
1915 deaths
French male épée fencers
Olympic fencers of France
Fencers at the 1900 Summer Olympics
Sportspeople from Dordogne